General Marion may refer to:

Charles Stanislas Marion (1758–1812), First French Empire brigadier general
Charles Marion (1887–1944), Vichy French general
Francis Marion (c. 1732–1795), South Carolina Militia brigadier general in the American Revolutionary War
Robert L. Marion (fl. 1980s–2020s), U.S. Army lieutenant general